Gowainghat is an upazila of Sylhet District in the Division of Sylhet, Bangladesh.

History
The British Empire conquered the Jaintia Kingdom on 25 March 1835, finally incorporating Gowainghat in its Sylhet District Collectorate. In 1908, the Gowainghat Thana was founded with the union of 5 parganas; Dhargram, Araikha, Piyaingul, Panchbhag and Jaflong and then separated into 9 union councils. During the Bangladesh Liberation War, the Pakistani army launched an attack in Ujuhat, Alirgaon killing 25 freedom fighters on the night of 28 November 1971. 7 mass graves are found in the upazila in Ujuhat, Atgram, Tamabil Zero Point, Health Complex and Birkuli. To commemorate the loss of lives, a memorial has been built. The thana prospered, officially upgrading to an upazila on 14 March 1983.

Geography
It has 34,133 households and a total area of 486.1 km2. The rivers are quarried for their stones, in areas like Bichnakandi.

Demographics
 Bangladesh census, Gowainghat has a population of 207,170. Males constituted 51.80% of the population, and females 48.20%. Gowainghat has an average literacy rate of 22.8%.

Administration
Gowainghat Upazila is divided into nine union parishads: Alirgaon, Daubaria, Fatehpur, Lengura, Nandirgaon, Purba Jaflong, Paschim Jaflong, Rustampur, and Towakul. The union parishads are subdivided into 231 mauzas and 266 villages.

Notable people
Saiful Alom, former member of the East Bengal Legislative Assembly
Abdul Hannan, former parliamentarian
Faizul Hasan, former member of the East Bengal Legislative Assembly
Dildar Hossain Selim, politician

See also
Upazilas of Bangladesh
Districts of Bangladesh
Divisions of Bangladesh

References

 
Upazilas of Sylhet District